The following are the national records in athletics in the Solomon Islands maintained by the Solomon Islands' national athletics federation: Athletic Solomons (AS).

Outdoor

Key to tables:

h = hand timing

Men

Women

Indoor

Men

Women

References
General
OAA: National Records Oceania 5 November 2020 updated
Specific

Solomon Islands
Records
Athletics
Athletics